Posht Qaleh (also Romanized as Posht Qal‘eh; also known as Qal‘eh) is a village in Dorud Rural District, in the Central District of Dorud County, Lorestan Province, Iran. At the 2006 census, its population was 453, in 98 families.

References 

Towns and villages in Dorud County